Hsueh Hsiang-chuan (born 12 December 1944) is a Taiwanese politician. He was the Secretary-General of the Executive Yuan in 2008-2009.

Early life
Hsueh obtained his doctoral degree in nutritional biochemistry from University of Wisconsin–Madison in the United States.

Executive Yuan

Secretary-general resignation
Hsueh resigned from Executive Yuan secretary-general post with the other cabinet members of Executive Yuan following the slow disaster response after Typhoon Morakot hit Taiwan in August 2009.

References

Political office-holders in the Republic of China on Taiwan
Living people
1944 births
National Taiwan University alumni
University of Wisconsin–Madison alumni